This list contains purported Lusitanian deities, that is the gods and goddesses of Lusitanian mythology.

A

Abna
Aernus
Aetio
Albucelainco
Ambieicris
Arabo
Aracus
Arentia
Arentio
Ares Lusitani
Ataegina

B

Bandua
Bormanicus (Borvo)

C

Cabuniaegenis
Candeberonio
Cariocecus
Carneus
Cauleces
Collouesei
Coronus
Coruae
Coso

D

Debaroni Muceaigaego
Dercetius
Duberdicus
Durius

E

Endovelicus
Edovio
Eniragillo
Epona
Erbina

F

Frovida

I

Igaedo

L

Laepo
Laho
Laneana
Laraucus
Lucubo 
Lurunis

M

Miraro Samaco
Moelio
Moricilo
Munidis

N

Nabia 
Netaci
Neto

O

Ocaere

Q

Quangeio

R

Reo
Reue
Runesocesius

S

Sulae Nantugaicae

T

Tameobrigus
Tomios

Toga
Tongoe
Tongoenabiagus
Torolo Gombiciego
Trebaruna 
Turiacus
Trebopala

V

Verore 
Vestio Alonieco

Name unknown

 A sun goddess later assimilated by Virgin Mary as Nossa Senhora d'Antime.

References and bibliography

Bibliography
 Coutinhas, José Manuel - Aproximação à identidade etno-cultural dos Callaici Bracari. Porto. 2006.
 García Fernández-Albalat, Blanca - Guerra y Religión en la Gallaecia y la Lusitania Antiguas. A Coruña. 1990.
 McKenna, Stephen. Paganism and Pagan Survivals in Spain up to the Fall of the Visigothic Kingdom. 
 Martínez, Sonia María García. "La epigrafía romana del concelho de Guimarães. Un estado de la cuestión". In: Revista de Guimarães, n.º 105, 1995, pp. 139-171.
 Pedreño, Juan Carlos Olivares. "Teonimos indigenas masculinos del ambito Lusitano-Galaico: un intento de síntesis". In: Revista de Guimarães, Volume Especial, I, Guimarães, 1999, pp. 277-296.
 Pedreño, Juan Carlos Olivares - Los Dioses de la Hispania Céltica. Madrid. 2002.
 Robalo, Mário. Deuses de pedra.

References

Further reading
 Prósper, Blanca. "The Lusitanian language in the name of the divinities Moelio Mordonieco and Torolo Combiciego, the Hispanic placename Mαιvάκη and related matters", Indogermanische Forschungen 103, 1998 (1998): 261-280, doi: https://doi.org/10.1515/9783110243444.261
 Prósper, Blanca Maria. "The Hispano-Celtic Divinity ILVRBEDA, Gold Mining in Western Hispania and the Syntactic Context of Celtiberian arkatobezom 'Silver Mine'". In: Die Sprache 49, 1 (2010-2011): 53–83.